Ermin Zec (born 18 February 1988) is a Bosnian professional footballer who plays as a forward or as a winger.

Club career

In 2007, Zec signed for Šibenik where he quickly established himself in the first team. He was voted best young Bosnian player of the year in 2009 by journalists. In a voting where all the captains in the Croatian League participated, Zec was voted the best player of the league in 2009.

In June 2010, he signed a four-year contract with Turkish club Gençlerbirliği.

After four years in Turkey, in September 2014, Zec returned to Croatia, signing with Rijeka.

At the beginning of 2015, Zec signed for Balıkesirspor on a three and a half year contract.

On 27 July 2015, je signed a one-year contract with Gabala in the Azerbaijan Premier League, with the option of an additional year. On 21 May, Gabala announced that Zec was leaving the club.

On 26 August 2016, Zec signed with Turkish Süper Lig club Karabükspor. During August 2017, he left Karabükspor.

On 25 August 2017, he signed with Gazişehir Gaziantep in the TFF First League. On 10 August 2018, it was announced that Zec left Gazişehir Gaziantep.

On 21 January 2019, he signed a contract with Bosnian Premier League club Željezničar.
He scored his first goal for Željezničar on 3 March 2019, in a 2–1 home league win against Mladost Doboj Kakanj. Zec extended his contract with Željezničar for three more years on 18 June 2019, which is due to keep him at the club until June 2022.

International career
Zec made his senior international debut on 19 November 2008, in a friendly match against Slovenia.

On 29 May 2010, he scored his first goal for the national team in a 4–2 loss against Sweden. Zec has earned a total of 10 caps, scoring 1 goal. His final international was a September 2015 European Championship qualification match against Andorra.

Personal life
Zec's younger brother, Asim, is also a professional footballer who played with him at Željezničar.

Career statistics

Club

International

International goals
Scores and results list Bosnia and Herzegovina's goal tally first.

Honours
Rijeka 
Croatian Super Cup: 2014

Individual
Awards
1. HNL Player of the Season: 2008–09

References

External links

Ermin Zec at Nogometni Magazin 

1988 births
Living people
People from Bugojno
Association football forwards
Association football wingers
Bosnia and Herzegovina footballers
Bosnia and Herzegovina international footballers
NK Iskra Bugojno players
HNK Šibenik players
Gençlerbirliği S.K. footballers
HNK Rijeka players
Balıkesirspor footballers
Gabala FC players
Kardemir Karabükspor footballers
Gaziantep F.K. footballers
FK Željezničar Sarajevo players
Croatian Football League players
Süper Lig players
Azerbaijan Premier League players
TFF First League players
Premier League of Bosnia and Herzegovina players
Bosnia and Herzegovina expatriate footballers
Expatriate footballers in Croatia
Bosnia and Herzegovina expatriate sportspeople in Croatia
Expatriate footballers in Turkey
Bosnia and Herzegovina expatriate sportspeople in Turkey
Expatriate footballers in Azerbaijan
Bosnia and Herzegovina expatriate sportspeople in Azerbaijan